Michael Robert Wilson (born 21 November 1976) is a former professional Australian rules footballer who played for Port Adelaide Football Club in the Australian Football League (AFL) and the South Australian National Football League (SANFL)

AFL career

Success (1997–2006)
Affectionately known as 'Wilbur', Wilson was one of the talented crop of youngsters making the transition from the SANFL to the national league as part of Port Adelaide's inaugural AFL squad in 1997. Playing primarily as an onballer Wilson immediately made an impression and took out the 1997 AFL Rising Star award as the league's best young prospect in his debut season. From 1998 onward, Wilson played primarily as a medium-sized defender rotating through the midfield on occasion.

With a pair of SANFL premiership medallions already in his keeping by age 19, Wilson was able to add the AFL equivalent in 2004, capping a brilliant individual season with a sturdy performance in Port Adelaide's first AFL flag win over the thrice reigning premiers, the Brisbane Lions. His high level of play was all the more remarkable given he had required a double shoulder reconstruction for some time.

Injury and retirement (2007–2008)

With a tremendous work ethic and a fearless disposition on the field, Wilson overcame both his shoulder problems and other serious injuries including two knee reconstructions to remain a vital part of the Power lineup a decade on.

In 2007 Wilson snapped his achilles tendon in Port's win over North Melbourne in the Preliminary Final and missed the Grand Final against Geelong.

Wilson announced his retirement from AFL football on 5 August 2008.

Playing statistics

|-
|- style="background-color: #EAEAEA"
! scope="row" style="text-align:center" | 1997
|style="text-align:center;"|
| 15 || 22 || 13 || 11 || 270 || 149 || 419 || 58 || 37 || 0.6 || 0.5 || 12.3 || 6.8 || 19.0 || 2.6 || 1.7
|-
! scope="row" style="text-align:center" | 1998
|style="text-align:center;"|
| 15 || 21 || 8 || 5 || 221 || 120 || 341 || 68 || 39 || 0.4 || 0.2 || 10.5 || 5.7 || 16.2 || 3.2 || 1.9
|- style="background-color: #EAEAEA"
! scope="row" style="text-align:center" | 1999
|style="text-align:center;"|
| 15 || 23 || 3 || 4 || 191 || 101 || 292 || 63 || 26 || 0.1 || 0.2 || 8.3 || 4.4 || 12.7 || 2.7 || 1.1
|-
! scope="row" style="text-align:center" | 2000
|style="text-align:center;"|
| 15 || 21 || 6 || 2 || 198 || 88 || 286 || 47 || 38 || 0.3 || 0.1 || 9.4 || 4.2 || 13.6 || 2.2 || 1.8
|- style="background-color: #EAEAEA"
! scope="row" style="text-align:center" | 2001
|style="text-align:center;"|
| 15 || 11 || 3 || 1 || 91 || 61 || 152 || 28 || 20 || 0.3 || 0.1 || 8.3 || 5.5 || 13.8 || 2.5 || 1.8
|-
! scope="row" style="text-align:center" | 2002
|style="text-align:center;"|
| 15 || 0 || — || — || — || — || — || — || — || — || — || — || — || — || — || —
|- style="background-color: #EAEAEA"
! scope="row" style="text-align:center" | 2003
|style="text-align:center;"|
| 21 || 15 || 2 || 1 || 104 || 60 || 164 || 54 || 31 || 0.1 || 0.1 || 6.9 || 4.0 || 10.9 || 3.6 || 2.1
|-
! scope="row" style="text-align:center" | 2004
|style="text-align:center;"|
| 21 || 23 || 9 || 8 || 228 || 167 || 395 || 93 || 62 || 0.4 || 0.3 || 9.9 || 7.3 || 17.2 || 4.0 || 2.7
|- style="background-color: #EAEAEA"
! scope="row" style="text-align:center" | 2005
|style="text-align:center;"|
| 21 || 16 || 0 || 2 || 142 || 89 || 231 || 65 || 41 || 0.0 || 0.1 || 8.9 || 5.6 || 14.4 || 4.1 || 2.6
|-
! scope="row" style="text-align:center" | 2006
|style="text-align:center;"|
| 21 || 16 || 3 || 4 || 120 || 80 || 200 || 68 || 33 || 0.2 || 0.3 || 7.5 || 5.0 || 12.5 || 4.3 || 2.1
|- style="background-color: #EAEAEA"
! scope="row" style="text-align:center" | 2007
|style="text-align:center;"|
| 21 || 19 || 4 || 1 || 161 || 121 || 282 || 83 || 42 || 0.2 || 0.1 || 8.5 || 6.4 || 14.8 || 4.4 || 2.2
|-
! scope="row" style="text-align:center" | 2008
|style="text-align:center;"|
| 21 || 5 || 0 || 0 || 37 || 22 || 59 || 13 || 8 || 0.0 || 0.0 || 7.4 || 4.4 || 11.8 || 2.6 || 1.6
|- class="sortbottom"
! colspan=3| Career
! 192
! 51
! 39
! 1763
! 1058
! 2821
! 640
! 377
! 0.3
! 0.2
! 9.2
! 5.5
! 14.7
! 3.3
! 2.0
|}

Notes

External links

1976 births
Living people
Port Adelaide Football Club (SANFL) players
Port Adelaide Magpies players
Port Adelaide Football Club players
Port Adelaide Football Club Premiership players
Port Adelaide Football Club players (all competitions)
AFL Rising Star winners
South Australian State of Origin players
Australian rules footballers from South Australia
One-time VFL/AFL Premiership players